Lithops julii is a species of succulent plant of the genus Lithops under the family Aizoaceae. It is native to Southern Africa, and was first collected by Professor Kurt Dinter, a German botanist, and named after his friend, Dr. Julius Derenberg.

Description 
Lithops julii has a leaf structure composed of pairs of leaves, out of the center of which flowers and new leaves grow. Leaves are usually a pale grey, with a grid of linear depressions. The colors of the depression vary from plant to plant, but can be tinges of red, brown, green, blue, pink, or beige.

References 

julii
Taxa named by N. E. Brown
Taxa named by Kurt Dinter
Taxa named by Martin Heinrich Gustav Schwantes